The Rural Municipality of Minitonas is a former rural municipality (RM) in the Canadian province of Manitoba. It was originally incorporated as a rural municipality on May 1, 1901. It ceased on January 1, 2015 as a result of its provincially mandated amalgamation with the Town of Minitonas and the Village of Bowsman to form the Municipality of Minitonas – Bowsman.

Communities 
 Renwer

References

External links 
 Map of Minitonas R.M. at Statcan

Minitonas
Populated places disestablished in 2015
2015 disestablishments in Manitoba